Narasapur is a village in Belgaum district of Karnataka, India.
The total geographical area of village is 808.34 hectares.

References

Villages in Belagavi district